A community of 622 people, Aberdeen is located 18 minutes north-east of Saskatoon, just off Highway 41.

History

Aberdeen was first settled by immigrants of Russian, English, Scottish and Ukrainian descent in the 1890s to 1900s. In particular, these initial settlers included people born in Eastern or Atlantic Canada, largely of English or Scottish ancestry, along with Ukrainian immigrants (1898–1899) and Mennonites from Manitoba (1901).

Originally named Dueck, it was organized as the hamlet of Aberdeen in 1904. It was named in honour of Ishbel Maria Marjoribanks Gordon, Lady Aberdeen, who was the founder of the National Council of Women of Canada. In 1904, the Canadian Northern Railway reached the town. By 1908, the railway had become critical for the sale of wheat, with 120 rail cars of hard wheat shipped out that year.

Business on Main Street peaked in the early 1930s, until it was largely destroyed by fire in 1937.

Demographics 

Infrastructure

Aberdeen Rec Complex 

The Aberdeen Recreation Complex (ARC) finished construction and opened for business in the fall of 2005. It is run by a board of directors and funded by the Aberdeen and District Charities Inc.  The ARC is home to the Aberdeen PreSchool, Dance Aberdeen, Wheatland Regional Library, AMHA Aberdeen Flames, and the Knights Senior Hockey Club. The Complex also has a café & lounge, fitness center, and meeting rooms.

Farm in the Dell 

Farm in the Dell is a community-based organization supporting people with disabilities in a rural farm-like setting through residential and vocational opportunities.  It currently operates one group home providing 10 residential spaces and a day program for 10 people. On June 1, 2018, the Farm in the Dell celebrated the development of a five-space group home, a two-space supervised independent living program and an expansion to the day program space. The Government of Saskatchewan provided more than $525,000 in annual funding to this initiative, bringing annual funding for Farm in the Dell to more than $1.4 million.

Water supply

SaskWater purchases water from the city of Saskatoon and then sells the water to the town of Aberdeen, which in turn sells it to local residents. This is facilitated through the use of a $4M pipeline that was completed in 2010.

See also 

 List of communities in Saskatchewan
 List of towns in Saskatchewan

References

External links

Towns in Saskatchewan
Aberdeen No. 373, Saskatchewan
Division No. 15, Saskatchewan